Nick Woodward (born November 29, 1979) is a former stock car racing driver. He competed in the NASCAR Busch Series and NASCAR Craftsman Truck Series. He currently works as the graphics manager for Richard Childress Racing.

Racing career
Woodward's racing career started at the age of eight, racing go-karts and dwarf cars. Woodward won three Virginia state go-kart championships and one national go-kart championship. He later raced both dirt and pavement late models, running at Hagerstown Speedway and Old Dominion Speedway.
In 2000, Woodward won five consecutive late model races at Southampton Motor Speedway, and won fourteen races on the season. He also won five late model races at South Boston Speedway. On the strength of that season, Woodward won the 2000 Atlantic Seaboard championship for the late model portion of the NASCAR Weekly Racing Series.

NASCAR
Woodward made two Craftsman Truck Series starts in 2001, both resulting in top-twenty finishes for Long Brothers Racing.

In May 2002, Woodward made his Busch Series debut at Dover International Speedway, driving the No. 49 for Jay Robinson Racing. He also tested a Craftsman Truck for Roush Racing in 2002.

Woodward returned to the Truck Series in 2003 for one more race with Long Brothers Racing.

Personal life
Woodward is a graduate of Colonel Richardson High School and High Point University. After his racing career ended, Woodward now works for Richard Childress Racing as the team's graphics manager. He is married.

Motorsports career results

NASCAR

Busch Series

Craftsman Truck Series

References

External links
 

1979 births
NASCAR drivers
Racing drivers from Maryland
Living people
People from Caroline County, Maryland
American Speed Association drivers
High Point University alumni